Bruce Brownlee is a former New Zealand professional squash player.

Brownlee was introduced to squash by his father Colin in Rotorua. In 1976 he won the British Amateur Championship. Brownlee won one New Zealand Open Championship and two national titles. He became a leading player in the late 1970s and early 1980s reaching a world ranking of six in January 1981. Whilst representing the Bay of Plenty he became the New Zealand number one and gained international honours.

He represented New Zealand in the 1976, 1977 and 1981 World Team Squash Championships. A hip injury forced his early retirement. He is married to Robyn Blackwood, a former leading women's player.

References

New Zealand male squash players
Year of birth missing (living people)
Living people
20th-century New Zealand people